The Lieutenants, elevation , are peaks located in the Purcell Mountains of southeast British Columbia, Canada. The nearest higher peak is Karnak Mountain,  to the southeast, and Commander Mountain is set  to the east. The mountain's name was officially adopted July 17, 1962, when approved by the Geographical Names Board of Canada. Based on the Köppen climate classification, The Lieutenants is located in a subarctic climate zone with cold, snowy winters, and mild summers.

See also

Geography of British Columbia

References

External links
 Weather: The Lieutenants
 Mountain Forecast: The Lieutenants

Three-thousanders of British Columbia
Purcell Mountains
Kootenay Land District